The Inaugural Futsal 5 A-Side Australia (FFAA) Interstate Club Championship was run in 2006 at the Coniston Indoor Soccer Centre.  It was initially just club teams from New South Wales and Victoria that participated.  Since then it has grown to see club teams from all over Australian States and Territories competing with clubs from New Zealand invited in 2009. The 2010 instalment will be back at Coniston (after 2 years at Castle Hill, Sydney) during the Australia Day Long Weekend in January.

Past Champions 

Here is a list of the Men's Division 1 Club Champions and Runners Up since the first tournament in 2006.

See also 
Futsal 5 A-Side Australia National Futsal Team

External links
Futsal 5 A-Side Australia (FFAA) Official Website

Futsal competitions in Australia